Odra is a river in central Croatia. Its source is in the Žumberak mountain, southwest of Zagreb. It flows eastwards, passes south of Velika Gorica, then turns south-east, more or less parallel to the river Sava. It flows into the river Kupa near Odra Sisačka, just northeast of Sisak, also just before the Kupa joins the river Sava.

There is no certain etymology for the river's name, it could be Slavic or pre-Slavic, and 20th-century linguists did not have a consensus about it.

References

Rivers of Croatia
Geography of Zagreb County